The Job is a 2003 American crime drama film directed and written by Kenny Golde Starring Daryl Hannah, Brad Renfro and Dominique Swain.

Plot

A hit woman is contracted to perform one final job before she leaves her life of cold-blooded killing behind forever. She is now faced with the challenge of dealing with carrying out the contract she accepted and her own moral values.

Cast

Daryl Hannah as Carol Jean "C.J." March
Brad Renfro as Troy Riverside
Dominique Swain as Emily Robin
Eric Mabius as Rick
Alex Rocco as Vernon Cray
Shawn Woods as Roger Washington
Alanna Hanly as Young C.
Bruce Nozick as Hal 
Joseph Whipp as The Man
Kiva Dawson as C.J.’s Mom
Michelangelo Kowalski as Parker

Release
The Job premiered at the Cannes Film Festival on May 16, 2003. However, it did not receive a theatrical release; instead, it was released straight-to-DVD on January 13, 2004, by Lionsgate Films.

Accolades

External links

2003 films
American crime thriller films
2000s crime thriller films
2000s English-language films
2000s American films